The Naval Information Warfare Systems Command (NAVWARSYSCOM), based in San Diego, is one of six SYSCOM Echelon II organizations within the United States Navy and is the Navy's technical authority and acquisition command for C4ISR (Command, Control, Communications, Computers, Intelligence, Surveillance and Reconnaissance), business information technology and space systems. Echelon II means that the organization reports to someone who, in turn, reports directly to the Chief of Naval Operations on the military side. From a civilian perspective, NAVWARSYSCOM reports to the Assistant Secretary of the Navy (RDA). The command was formerly known as SPAWAR, or the Space and Naval Warfare Systems Command and was renamed in June 2019 to better align its identity with its mission.

NAVWARSYSCOM supports over 150 programs managed by the Program Executive Office (PEO) for Command, Control, Communications, Computers and Intelligence (C4I), as well as the programs of PEO for Enterprise Information Systems (PEO EIS) and PEO Space Systems.  These PEOs are located in the greater Washington, D.C. area.  The Naval Information Warfare Center (NIWC) Atlantic is located in Charleston, SC, and also includes facilities in Norfolk, VA, New Orleans and Stuttgart, Germany. NIWC Pacific is located in San Diego, and includes facilities in Japan, Guam and Hawaii. Effective February 18, 2019, the names of the systems centers changed to Naval Information Warfare Center Atlantic and Pacific.

History
A number of mergers over the years have led to the current organization. Eighty percent of the Point Loma Military Reservation evolved into the Naval Electronics Laboratory Center (NELC) at the end of World War II. In the 1960s, NELC was tasked with 4C: Command, Control, Communications and Computers. In 1977 NELC was merged into the Naval Ocean Systems Center (NOSC) and eventually was merged into SPAWAR (now NAVWAR).

The Naval Command, Control and Ocean Surveillance Center (NCCOSC) was SPAWAR's warfare center for command, control, communications, and ocean surveillance.  NCCOSC's mission, as part of SPAWAR, was to develop, acquire, and support systems for information transfer and management to provide U.S. naval forces a decisive warfare advantage, and to be the Navy's center for research, development, test and evaluation, engineering, and fleet support for command, control, communications, and ocean surveillance systems.

In June 2019, the Space and Naval Warfare Systems Command was renamed the Naval Information Warfare Systems Command.

Site redevelopment
In May 2021, the US Navy released an exposure draft of a proposal to re-develop the roughly  NAVWAR site, to consist of:
  of total development, of which:
  for all-new Navy cybersecurity buildings and employee parking spots, with that portion to be built by a private partner within the first five years;
 10,000 units (and 14,400 parking stalls) for a neighborhood population of over 14,000 people,
  of commercial office space,
  of mostly ground-level stores,
 a  transit center with 500 parking spots, and
 two hotels offering a total of 450 rooms.

Responsibilities

NAVWARSYSCOM designs and develops communications and information systems. They employ over 12,000 professionals located around the world and close to the United States Navy fleet.

NAVWARSYSCOM is responsible for managing Air Traffic Control contractors in Afghanistan, including the Kabul en route air traffic control center, the Kabul, Kandahar, and Bagram approach control radar facilities, and respective control towers.

NAVWARSYSCOM provides systems engineering and technical support for the development and maintenance of C4ISR (command, control, communications, computers, intelligence, surveillance and reconnaissance), business information technology and space capabilities. These are used in ships, aircraft and vehicles to connect individual platforms into integrated systems for the purpose of information sharing among Navy, Marine, joint forces, federal agencies and international allies.

Command and Control: to organize, direct, coordinate, deploy and control forces to accomplish assigned missions
Responsible for managing Air Traffic Control contractors in the Afghanistan theater of operations. Includes the Kabul en route air traffic control center, Kabul, Kandahar, and Bagram approach control radar facilities, as well as control towers at all three locations.
Intelligence, Surveillance, Reconnaissance and Information Operations: to collect, process, exploit and disseminate information regarding an adversary's capability and intent
Cyberspace Operations: to operate and protect communications and networks, while exploiting and disrupting adversary's command and control
Business Information Technology (IT) and Enterprise Information Systems: to enable business processes and to ensure standard IT capabilities
Enterprise Systems Engineering: to develop solutions based on capability needs, design considerations and constraints
Space Systems: to procure and manage narrowband communication satellites in support of the Department of Defense and other government agencies
Communications and Networks: to provide information through voice, video and data

Program Executive Offices (PEO) 

NAVWAR's three affiliated Program Executive Offices (PEOs) are responsible for the prototyping, procurement, and fielding of C4ISR (Command, Control, Communications, Computers, Intelligence, Surveillance and Reconnaissance), business information technology and space systems. Their mission is to develop, acquire, field and sustain affordable and integrated state of the art equipment for the Navy.

PEOs report to the NAVWAR commander for planning and execution of in-service support, and to the Assistant Secretary of the Navy (Research, Development and Acquisition) for acquisition-related matters.

The NAVWAR-affiliated PEOs are:

 Program Executive Office Command, Control, Communications, Computers and Intelligence (PEO C4I) and Space Systems
 Program Executive Office for Digital and Enterprise Services (PEO Digital)
 Program Executive Office Manpower, Logistics and Business Solutions (PEO MLB)

See also
Naval Information Warfare Center Pacific
Naval Information Warfare Center Atlantic
NAVWAR Space Field Activity
U.S. Armed Forces systems commands
 Army Materiel Command
 Marine Corps Systems Command
 United States Navy systems commands
 Naval Sea Systems Command
 Naval Air Systems Command
 Naval Facilities Engineering Systems Command
 Naval Supply Systems Command
 Air Force Materiel Command
 Space Systems Command

References

External links

SPAWAR Headquarters Facebook Page

Shore commands of the United States Navy
Military in San Diego
Military units and formations established in 2012
Space warfare
Military Superfund sites